Denmark participated in the Eurovision Song Contest 1999 with the song "This Time I Mean It" written by Ebbe Ravn. The song was performed by Trine Jepsen and Michael Teschl. The Danish broadcaster DR returned to the Eurovision Song Contest after a one-year absence following their relegation from 1998 as one of the six countries with the least total average points over the preceding five contests. DR organised the national final Dansk Melodi Grand Prix 1999 in order to select the Danish entry for the 1999 contest in Jerusalem, Israel. Five songs competed in a televised show where "Denne gang" performed by the Trine Jepsen and Michael Teschl was the winner as decided upon through jury and public voting. The song was later translated from Danish to English for the Eurovision Song Contest and was titled "This Time I Mean It".

Denmark competed in the Eurovision Song Contest which took place on 29 May 1999. Performing during the show in position 9, Denmark placed eighth out of the 23 participating countries, scoring 71 points.

Background 

Prior to the 1999 contest, Denmark had participated in the Eurovision Song Contest twenty-eight times since its first entry in 1957. The Danish national broadcaster, DR, broadcasts the event within Denmark and organises the selection process for the nation's entry. The broadcaster organised the Dansk Melodi Grand Prix 1999 national final in order to select Denmark's entry for the 1999 contest; Denmark has selected all of their Eurovision entries through Dansk Melodi Grand Prix.

Before Eurovision

Dansk Melodi Grand Prix 1999 
Dansk Melodi Grand Prix 1999 was the 30th edition of Dansk Melodi Grand Prix, the music competition that selects Denmark's entries for the Eurovision Song Contest. The event was held on 13 March 1999 during the DR1 programme Musikbutikken, which took place at the DR Studio 3 in Copenhagen and hosted by Keld Heick. The national final was watched by 1.384 million viewers in Denmark, making it the most popular show of the week in the country.

Competing entries 
A selection committee selected five composers that were invited by DR to submit their entries. All songs were required to be performed in Danish, while the artists of the submitted entries were chosen by DR in consultation with their composers.

Final 
The final took place on 13 March 1999. The winner, "Denne gang" performed by Trine Jepsen and Michael Teschl, was selected based on the combination of votes from a public televote (4/5) and the votes of a six-member jury (1/5). The jury voting results along with the voting results of each of Denmark's four regions were converted to points which were each distributed as follows: 4, 6, 8, 10 and 12 points. The six-member jury panel was composed of six singers: Johnny Reimar, Danish Eurovision 1987 entrant Anne-Cathrine Herdorf, Ann-Louise, Anders Frandsen, Alex Nyborg Madsen and Swedish Eurovision Song Contest 1991 winner Carola Häggkvist. In addition to the performances of the competing entries, British Eurovision Song Contest 1976 winner Brotherhood of Man performed as the interval act.

At Eurovision 
According to Eurovision rules, all nations with the exceptions of the eight countries that averaged the least points over the preceding five contests until the 1998 contest competed in the final on 29 May 1999. On 17 November 1998, a special allocation draw was held which determined the running order and Denmark was set to perform in position 9, following the entry from Norway and before the entry from France. Denmark finished in eighth place with 71 points.

The show was broadcast on DR1 with commentary by Keld Heick. The Danish spokesperson, who announced the Danish votes during the final, was 1985 and 1988 Danish Eurovision entrant Kirsten Siggaard. The contest was watched by a total of 1 million viewers in Denmark.

Voting 
Below is a breakdown of points awarded to Denmark and awarded by Denmark in the contest. The nation awarded its 12 points to Iceland in the contest.

References 

1999
Countries in the Eurovision Song Contest 1999
Eurovision